Henri Bonnet (26 May 1888 Châteauponsac (Haute-Vienne) – 25 October 1978 Paris) was a French politician, diplomat, and French ambassador to the United States from 1944 to 1954.

The son of J. Th. and Marie Thérèse (Lascoux) Bonnet; he was educated at the Lycées of Tours and Paris; the University of Paris; École Normale Supérieure, Paris 1921. He was married to Hellé Zervoudaki. He was foreign editor for "Ere Nouvelle" in 1919; Director, International Institute of Intellectual Cooperation, 1931-40.

He was a member of the secretariat of the League of Nations from 1921 to 1931. He was Information Commissioner in the French Committee of National Liberation (CFLN), and the Provisional Government of the French Republic (GPRF), from 3 June to 9 September 1944. He was named, after the official recognition of GFRP by the United States, the representative of France in Washington.

Works
The world's destiny and the United States, World Citizens Association, 1941
The United Nations on the way: principles and policies,  World Citizens Association, 1942
Intellectual co-operation in world organization, American Council on Public Affairs, 1942

References

External links
 French Minister George Bidault, James F. Byrnes and Henri Bonnet talking at the French Embassy reception.
 Overview of the Henri Bonnet typescript : The United Nations
 

1888 births
1978 deaths
20th-century French diplomats
Ambassadors of France to the United States
League of Nations people
People from Haute-Vienne
Ministers of Information of France